The Bootleg Series Vol. 7: No Direction Home: The Soundtrack is a compilation album by Bob Dylan. The fifth installment in the ongoing Bob Dylan Bootleg Series, it was released in 2005 in conjunction with the Martin Scorsese PBS television documentary on Dylan, No Direction Home, and was compiled with Scorsese's input. It features mostly previously unreleased material from Dylan's formative years to his rise as an international figure, from 1959 to his 1966 world tour.

The Bootleg Series Vol. 7: No Direction Home: The Soundtrack fared well commercially, debuting on the Billboard 200 album chart on September 17, 2005 at number 16, with sales of 50,987 copies. It remained on the chart for 11 weeks. It was certified a gold record on October 21, 2005 by the RIAA. It also reached number 21 in the UK.

Preparation
The project eventually titled as No Direction Home began to take form in 1995 when Dylan's manager, Jeff Rosen, began scheduling interviews with Dylan's friends and associates. Among those interviewed were poet Allen Ginsberg and folk musician Dave Van Ronk, both of whom died before the film was ever completed. Dylan's old girlfriend Suze Rotolo also granted a rare interview, and she later told Rolling Stone that she was very pleased with the project's results. Dylan himself also sat for ten hours in a relaxed and open conversation with Rosen in 2000.

According to Rolling Stone, an unnamed source close to the project claimed that Dylan himself had no involvement with the project apart from the interview, saying that "[Dylan] has no interest in this … Bob truly does not look back." However, work on the first installment of Dylan's autobiography, Chronicles, Vol. 1, did overlap production of the project, though it is unclear how much, if any, influence Chronicles may have had on No Direction Home.

Though raw material was being gathered for the project, Rosen needed someone to edit and shape it into a quality picture, and celebrated filmmaker Martin Scorsese was approached to "direct" the documentary planned from the project. Scorsese eventually agreed and came aboard in 2001.

In the meantime, Dylan's office gathered hundreds of hours of historical film footage dating from the time covered in No Direction Home. These included a scratchy recording of Dylan's high school rock band, his 1965 screen test for Andy Warhol, and newly discovered footage of the famous Manchester, England concert from May 17, 1966, when an angry fan called out "Judas!" just before Dylan and the Hawks performed "Like a Rolling Stone". Shot by D. A. Pennebaker, the onstage, color footage was found in 2004 in a pile of water-damaged film recovered from Dylan's vaults.

At the same time, musical recordings from Dylan's archives were also being explored for an accompanying soundtrack. As originally planned, the soundtrack included live performances featured in the film, such as Dylan's first live electric performance—"Maggie's Farm", backed by the Paul Butterfield Blues Band—at the 1965 Newport Folk Festival. Producer Steve Berkowitz helped create the first multitrack mix of this performance which was ultimately used for the soundtrack, saying "it's raw, it's punk rock...There was nothing overdubbed, nothing changed. Everything in the soundtrack was mixed and mastered to sound like it sounded then." Many performances could not be remixed, including a 1966 performance of "Ballad of a Thin Man" which was taken from a mono recording, the only one ever made. "It's totally distorto, but I love it," says Berkowitz. "Talk about verite—it's [absolutely] perfect." Despite the praise, the recording appears in "fake" stereo on the compilation.

However, as the soundtrack was compiled, it was eventually decided to include material that was not featured in the documentary, including many previously unreleased studio outtakes.

Track listing
All songs written by Bob Dylan, except where noted

Disc one

Three outtakes were released as an internet single for download entitled Exclusive Outtakes from No Direction Home.

References

2005 compilation albums
2005 live albums
2005 soundtrack albums
Bob Dylan compilation albums
Bob Dylan live albums
Bob Dylan soundtracks
Columbia Records compilation albums
Columbia Records live albums
Columbia Records soundtracks
Television soundtracks